Gabriel Yacoub is a French musician, songwriter and visual artist.

Biography
Yacoub was born in 1952, in Paris, of a Lebanese father and a French mother.  He was a guitarist and singer with the Alan Stivell group that toured France in 1971. Before he founded Malicorne, Gabriel and Marie Yacoub recorded the experimental album Pierre de Grenoble (1973). Indeed, this was originally intended to be the name of the group. It included contributions from Dan Ar Braz. With Malicorne, Gabriel played acoustic and electric guitar, mandolin, epinette de Vosges and banjo, while Marie played electric dulcimer, bouzouki and hurdy-gurdy. In 1978 Gabriel recorded a solo album called Trad. Arr., which featured English fiddler Barry Dransfield as guest.

Solo years 
In the final year of Malicorne, 1986 Yacoub recorded Elementary Level of Faith. After a four-year gap he toured as a duo with Marie. He released Bel which had a string quartet on it and bagpipes from Jean-Pierre Rasle (who had previously recorded with The Albion Country Band). By the time of Quatre (1994), he had appeared on 15 albums.

He finally recorded an album of his songs in English in 2002, The Simple Things We Said. He has written a book of poetry and lyrics, called Les choses les plus simples.

Discography 
Source:

Gabriel and Marie Yacoub 
 Pierre de Grenoble		(1973)

Gabriel Yacoub 
 Trad. Arr.		(1978)
 Elementary Level of Faith	(1986)
 BEL			(1990)
 Quatre	  	        (1994)
 Babel			(1997)
 Tri (compilation)		(1999)
 Yacoub			(2001)
 The Simple Things We Said	(2002)
 In concert
 Je vois venir		(2004)
 De la Nature des Choses	(2008)

References

External links 
 Discography at music-city.org
 Official website

1952 births
Living people
Musicians from Paris
Celtic rock music
Fast Folk artists
French musicians
French people of Lebanese descent